This is a list of educational institutions located in the district of Lahore in Pakistan. Special education institutions are listed at List of special education institutions in Lahore.

Primary and secondary educational institutions
IPS Uni (Unit Of Education)
Inspire Education consultants(2009) Lahore
Genuine Technology of Computer College
Matiz Education Consultants
Nordic International School Lahore
ACE School System
ACE Elementary School
ACES Gabriel International School
Shan Computer College, Lahore
Shan Computer College

Adabistan-e-Soophia School
Aitchison College, Lahore
Al-A'la International Islamic School
Shining Girls High School
Alma Mater School
American International School System
American Lycetuff School System
American Lyceum
Beaconhouse Newlands, Lahore
Beaconhouse School System
Benison Islamic School
Bloomfield Hall School
Central Model School 
Chand Bagh School
Convent of Jesus and Mary
Career Institute
Crescent Model Higher Secondary School 
Dar-e-Arqam Schools
Dar-ul-Mominien Schooling System
Divisional Public School
Epic Islamic School
Esena Foundation High School
Fairfield High School lahore
Farooq Girls High School
FG Fazaia Secondary School, PAF Base Iqbal Camp, Lahore
Fazaia Inter College
Genuine Technology of Computer College
Franciscan Girls High School
Forman Christian College
Froebel's International School
Government College of Science
Garrison College for Boys , 52-A Sarfraz Rafiqui Road , Lahore Cantt.
Garison boys high school
Grand Charter School
Government Gulberg High School, Lahore Cantt
Hashmat Memorial Schools System
Heritage School System 
International School of Choueifat
Islamic International School System
Jinnah Foundation High School
Joan McDonald High School, Lahore
Khaliqia Foundation High School
Kibria Model High School
King Way Group of Schools
KIPS School and College

Lahore Academy of Science and Technology
Lahore American School
Lahore College of Arts and Sciences
Lahore Garrison Education System
Lahore Grammar School
Lahore Presentation Convent School
Lahore Cantt Public High School
Leaders Canadian School
St. Lawrence High School, Gulberg
Lexicon School System Lahore Cantt
Learning Alliance
Maktab-A MIT Alumnus's Educational Initiative
MQ Foundation High School
Mus'ab School System
New Era Grammar School
National Grammar School
Pakistan Public School (PPS) Township, Lahore
PakTurk International Schools and Colleges
Queen Mary College
Resource Academia
Rosans Islamic School
Sacred Heart High School for Boys
Sacred Heart High School for Girls
Salamat School System
Scholastic Islamiah
School for Contemporary and Islamic Learning
School of Lahore
Silk School System
Siqarah Girls High School, Awaisia Society, College, Road, Lahore
Sir Syed School System
Smart School System
Society Public School
St. Anthony's High School
St Francis High School
St. Mary's High School
St. Thomas' School, Gulberg
Stellar School System
The School Of Wisdom
The Citizens Foundation
The City School
The Country School (a project of Bloomfield Hall School)
The Lahore Alma
The Learners Grammar High School
The Learners Kids Campus
The Lahore Lyceum
The Oneiro Schoolhouse
The Punjab Academy 77-E-1, wapda town lhr
The Punjab School
The Trust School
The Westbridge Junior & Upper School
The Westbridge Schools
Superior Group of Colleges
University College Lahore
Unique Group Of Colleges
Universal High School Lahore
Govt. High School Balloki, Kasur (Boys)
The Punjab School, Defence Road Campus
The punjab School, Jubilee Town Campus
Right Education, Lahore

Tertiary and quaternary educational institutions

Universities
The following is a list of universities recognized by Higher Education Commission of Pakistan (HEC):

Public universities
COMSATS Institute of Information Technology*
Bahria University, Lahore*
Government College University
Information Technology University
King Edward Medical University 
Kinnaird College for Women 
Lahore College for Women University 
National College of Arts
University of Education 
University of Engineering and Technology 
University of Health Sciences
University of the Punjab
University of Veterinary and Animal Sciences 
Virtual University of Pakistan

Private universities
Beaconhouse National University
Forman Christian College
Global Institute Lahore
Hajvery University
Imperial College of Business Studies
Institute of Management Sciences 
Lahore Garrison University
Lahore School of Economics 
Lahore University of Management Sciences 
Minhaj University 
National College of Business Administration & Economics
National University of Computer and Emerging Sciences *
National University of Modern Languages *
Nur International University Lahore- Fatima Memorial System
PIQC Institute of Quality Lahore
Qarshi University
Riphah International University
The Superior College 
University of Central Punjab 
University of Lahore
Infinity School of Engineering Lahore
University of Sargodha Lahore
University of Management and Technology
University of South Asia
University of management and technology. 
 * main campus is located in Lahore

Schools of accounting
The following is a list of institutes recognized by Institute of Chartered Accountants of Pakistan (ICAP):

 CFE College of Accountancy and Finance
 College of Accountancy & Professional Studies
 Financial Training College
 IBF - Institute of Business & Finance
 Professionals' Academy of Commerce
 RISE School of Accountancy
 SKANS School of Accountancy
 University of Lahore

Schools of allied health sciences
Advance Life College of Medical Sciences Lahore (Affiliated with G C University Faisalabad)
King Edward Medical University
Superior University
University of Lahore
University of Health Sciences, Lahore - affiliated institutes:
Shaikh Khalifa Bin Zayed Al-Nahyan Medical and Dental College
Allama Iqbal Medical College
De'Montmorency College of Dentistry
Fatima Jinnah Medical College
FMH Institute of Allied Health Sciences
Gulab Devi Postgraduate Medical Institute
Institute of Public Health
Lahore Medical and Dental College
Punjab Institute of Cardiology (only B.Sc in Cardiac Perfusion)
Services Institute of Medical Sciences
The Children's Hospital (School of Allied Health Sciences)
University of Veterinary and Animal Sciences

Schools of architecture
Beaconhouse National University (School of Architecture and Design)
COMSATS University of Science and Technology (Department of Architecture and Design)
National College of Arts (Department of Architecture)
Superior University Lahore
University of Engineering and Technology (School of Architecture and Design)
University of the Punjab (School of Art and Design)
University of Management and Technology (Institute of Textile and Industrial Sciences (ITIS))
University of South Asia

Schools of business
The following is a list of institutes recognized by National Business Education Accreditation Council (NBEAC):

COMSATS Institute of Information Technology (main campus is located in Islamabad)
Imperial College of Business Studies
Superior University, Faculty of Business Administration
Hailey College of Banking and Finance
Hailey College of Commerce
Imperial College of Business Studies, School of Management and Business Studies
Institute of Management Sciences, Department of Management Sciences
Lahore School of Economics, Faculty of Business Administration
Lahore University of Management Sciences, Suleman Dawood School of Business
National College of Business Administration and Economics, School of Business Administration
National University of Computer and Emerging Sciences, FAST School of Management (main campus in Islamabad)
University of Central Punjab, UCP Business School
University of Engineering and Technology, Institute of Business and Management
University of Lahore, Lahore Business School
University of Management and Technology, School of Business and Economics
University of the Punjab
University of South Asia, USA Business School
University of Veterinary and Animal Sciences, Lahore, UVAS Business School
Virtual University of Pakistan Faculty of Management
The Girls College Lahore   Institute of Business and Commerce

Schools of computing
The following is a list of institutes recognized by National Computing Education Accreditation Council (NCEAC):
 COMSATS Institute of Information Technology (Lahore campus) - BS-CS
 Bahria University (Lahore campus) - BS-CS, BS-IT
 Government College University, Lahore - BS-CS
 Lahore College for Women University - BS-CS
 National University of Computer & Emerging Sciences (Lahore campus)* - BS-CS
 Punjab University College of Information Technology (PUCIT) - BS-CS, BS-IT, BS-SE
 University of Engineering and Technology, Lahore - BS-CS
 University of Management and Technology - BS-CS, BS-SE
 Superior University - BCS, BS-IT
 Lahore Garrison University - BSCS
 The University of Lahore
 University of Central Punjab
 University of Education lahore 
 Information Technology University, Lahore
 PiCiT Computer College
 University of South Asia
 Virtual University of Pakistan Faculty of CS & IT* oldest computer science department in LahoreSchools of dentistry
The following is a list of undergraduate dental institutions recognized by PMDC.

Shaikh Khalifa Bin Zayed Al-Nahyan Medical and Dental College
CMH Lahore Medical and Dental College 
De'Montmorency College of Dentistry
FMH College of Medicine and Dentistry
Lahore Medical and Dental College
Shalamar Medical and Dental College
Sharif Medical and Dental College
University College of Medicine and Dentistry

Schools of engineering
The following is a list of institutes recognized by Pakistan Engineering Council (PEC):
Infinity School of Engineering
Allama Iqbal Open University
Institute of Engineering and Technology
Government College University
Lahore College for Women University
Lahore University of Management Sciences
National University of Computer and Emerging Sciences (Lahore Campus)
Superior University Lahore
University of Central Punjab
University of Engineering and Technology
University of Lahore
University of Management and Technology
University of the Punjab 
College of Engineering and Emerging Technologies
Institute of Chemical Engineering and Technology
Institute of Quality and Technology Management
University of South Asia

Schools of fashion
International Fashion Academy Pakistan
Institute of art design & Management - STEP
Lahore School of Fashion Design
Pakistan Institute of Fashion and Design

Schools of law
Lahore University of Management Sciences (School of Humanities, Social Sciences and Law)
Superior College of Law
Topper Law College Lahore
University College Lahore
University of Lahore, "College of Law"
University of the Punjab (Punjab University Law College)
City Law College
 Hamayat Islam Law College
 Himayat-e-Islam Degree College for Women
 Lahore Law College
 Pakistan College of Law
 Punjab Law College
 Quaid-e-Azam Law College
 Leads Law College, Township, Lahorewww.llc.edu.pk
University of South Asia, Law DepartmentSchools of medicine
The following is a list of undergraduate medical institutions recognized by Pakistan Medical and Dental Council (PMDC) as of 2010.

King Edward Medical University
Superior University
Azra Naheed Medical College
University of Lahore
University College of Medicine and Dentistry
University of Health Sciences
Akhtar Saeed Medical and Dental College
Allama Iqbal Medical College
Ameer-ud-Din Medical College
Avicenna Medical College
Central Park Medical College
CMH Lahore Medical and Dental College
Continental Medical College
FMH College of Medicine and Dentistry
Johar Institute of Professional Studies (University of Sargodha - UoS)
Lahore Medical and Dental College
Pak Red Crescent Medical and Dental College
Rashid Latif Medical College
Services Institute of Medical Sciences
Shalamar Medical and Dental College
Sharif Medical and Dental College
University of the Punjab
Fatima Jinnah Medical College
Shaikh Khalifa Bin Zayed Al-Nahyan Medical and Dental College

The following is a list of postgraduate medical institutions recognized by PMDC as of 2009.

College of Physicians and Surgeons of Pakistan
Gulab Devi Postgraduate Medical Institute
Institute of Public Health
Punjab Institute of Cardiology
Shaikh Zayed Postgraduate Medical Institute
University of Health Sciences

Schools of nursing
Children's Hospital *
Combined Military Hospital * **
Ittefaq Hospital *
Jinnah Hospital * **
Lady Aitchison Hospital *
Lady Willingdon Hospital *
Lahore General Hospital *
Mayo Hospital *
Saida Waheed College of Nursing * **
Services Hospital *
University of Lahore *
Shaikh Zayed Hospital *
Shalamar Nursing College **
Sir Ganga Ram Hospital *
Postgraduate College of Nursing *
Saida Waheed College of Nursing * **
Shalamar Nursing College **
 * recognized by PNS for 2 year Post RN B.Sc in Nursing, as of 2011 ** affiliated with University of Health Sciences, Lahore for 2 year Post RN B.Sc in Nursing, as of 2012''

Schools of pharmacy
The following is a list of pharmacy institutions that are recognized by the Pharmacy Council of Pakistan (PCP):
Akhtar Saeed College of Pharmaceutical Sciences, University of Sargodha
Hajvery University
Lahore College for Women University
Lahore College of Pharmaceutical Sciences, University of Sargodha
Lahore Pharmacy College, University of Health Sciences
Superior University 
The National Institute of Health Sciences, University of Health Sciences
University College of Pharmacy, University of the Punjab
University of Central Punjab
University of Lahore
University of Veterinary and Animal Sciences
Johar Institute of Professional Studies (University of Sargodha)

Schools of veterinary medicine
Riphah International University
Riphah College of Veterinary Sciences
University of Veterinary and Animal Sciences

Other institutes
Don Bosco Technical Institute
PIQC Institute of Quality Lahore
EVS Professional Training Institute
Genuine Technology of Computer College
Ahmad Hassan Polytechnic Institute - affiliated with University of Sargodha
Al-Mawrid Institute of Islamic Sciences
Government College of Science
Lahore Bible Baptist College
Assemblies of Souls Winners Bible College
Lahore College of Theology
Net Scope Computer College, Lahore
Multan Institute of Professional Studies Multan 
ThinkFaculty Professional Training

See also 
Education in Lahore
List of special education institutions in Lahore

References

External links

Education in Lahore
Lahore
Lahore
Lahore